Sakkarakatti is a 2008 Indian Tamil-language musical romantic comedy film written and directed by Kala Prabhu and produced by his father, Kalaipuli S. Dhanu. It featured debutant Shanthanu Bhagyaraj, son of veteran actor K. Bhagyaraj, in the lead role while Ishita Sharma and Vedhika played significant roles. It featured a soundtrack composed by A. R. Rahman. Sakkarakatti released on 26 September 2008.

Plot
Chennai-bred Yuvraj (Shanthanu Bhagyaraj) has had four close friends from childhood. He meets and falls in love with his only girl, only friend, only cousin, only niece, only sister, only daughter, only girlfriend, Deepali (Ishita Sharma). However, his only girl, only friend, only cousin, only niece, only sister, only daughter, only girlfriend, Reema (Vedhika) is in love with him. After Deepali sees Yuvraj with Reema, she becomes jealous and ignores Yuvraj when he follows her. Then, Yuvraj and Deepali get back together. Later, she sees Yuvraj and Reema together, but it was an accident. Deepali starts ignoring him again. Yuvraj wants to prove that he was not with Reema, so his friends decide to throw a birthday party to mend the trio's fractured relationship. Deepali and Yuvraj finally unite.

Cast
 Shanthanu Bhagyaraj as Yuvaraj
 Ishita Sharma as Deepali
 Vedhika as Reema
 Nizhalgal Ravi as Yuvaraj's father
 Lokesh Baskaran as Yuvaraj's friend
 Amit as Vikram
 Yugesh Kumar as Gokul
Sachin as young Gokul
 Chitti Babu as Shop owner
 Crazy Mohan as Librarian
 Shobi (special appearance in the song "Taxi Taxi Nanba")
 Blaaze (special appearance in the song "Taxi Taxi Nanba")

Production
The producer Kalaipuli S. Dhanu began launched the film, Sakkarakatti, at AVM Studios on 29 April 2006 with A. R. Rahman, Vijay and K. Balachandar all attending. The film featured Dhanu's son, Kalaprabhu, in his debut as director whilst Shanthnoo Bhagyaraj, son of noted actor K. Bhagyaraj, was selected to portray the lead role. The film was initially described as a "candy floss love story with a city subject" and was set to feature Ishita Sharma and Sivi in other lead roles, although Sivi was later replaced by Vedhika. During the making of Sakkarakatti, cinematographer Andrew left the project as his dates clashed with a prior commitment with a Hindi film and was duly replaced by cinematographer Raja.

A song with graphics arranged by Soundarya Rajinikanth's Ocher Studios was shot in May 2008 at a cost of 35 lakh rupees, with the producer then exclaiming that "the song will be the talk of the town" when released. The song "Taxi Taxi" was reshot following the enormous response from the audience after the audio release.

Release
Sakkarakatti opened alongside Sun Pictures' Kadhalil Vizhunthen at the box office on 26 September 2008 with the media hyping that it was a battle of two films with debutants and successful soundtracks.

Critical reception
Behindwoods cited : "Shanthanu has to play a thinly sketched hero, but he puts energy and charm into everything he does. He is more than promising- he's star material, and he’ll survive this wreck. The debuting heroine, Ishita Sharma, is unimpressive. The second heroine, Vedhika, dances well and at least has some screen presence. ", while Sify said: "Shantanoo has that star quality to him which is so rare to find these days. But he is wasted in a role in which he just romance his heroines and dances", Nowrunning said: "Shanthanoo is fairly convincing as a cool college dude who metro audiences would love. He has not much to do beyond hanging out with his friends and cuddling the two heroines. Though the young hero seems bubbly, Prabhu is not able to tap his potential. Vedhika steals the show with her excellent performance as a jealous "morai penn' out to defeat the other girl. Her face-off with the hero in the climax deserves a big hand. ".

Soundtrack 

The score and soundtrack was composed by A. R. Rahman and the album was released on 12 July 2008. Initially Rahman was reluctant to compose the music for Sakkarakatti citing he was busy with other projects, but the director asked if Rahman could recycle songs from his Hindi films and he agreed. Rahman reused "Chinnamma Chilakkamma" and "Yeh Rishta" from Meenaxi: A Tale of Three Cities as "Chinnamma Chilakamma" and "Naan Eppodhu."  Haza happens to be the alter-ego of singer Chinmayee as per her blog. A reviewer from Indiaglitz.com stated that "Sakkarakatti is truly as sweet as sugar candy" in regard to the soundtrack.

References

External links
 
 Sakkarakatti Movie

2008 films
Indian romantic comedy films
2000s Tamil-language films
Films scored by A. R. Rahman
2008 romantic comedy films